The 1960 Japan Series was the Nippon Professional Baseball (NPB) championship series for the 1960 season. It was the 11th Japan Series and featured the Pacific League champions, the Daimai Orions, against the Central League champions, the Taiyo Whales.

Summary

Matchups

Game 1
Tuesday, October 11, 1960 – 1:04 pm at Kawasaki Stadium in Kawasaki, Kanagawa Prefecture

Game 2
Wednesday, October 12, 1960 – 12:59 pm at Kawasaki Stadium in Kawasaki, Kanagawa Prefecture

Game 3
Friday, October 14, 1960 – 1:00 pm at Korakuen Stadium in Bunkyō, Tokyo

Game 4
Saturday, October 15, 1960 – 1:00 pm at Korakuen Stadium in Bunkyō, Tokyo

See also
1960 World Series

References

Japan Series
Japan Series
Japan Series
Japan Series